Vojin "Škoba" Božović (Cyrillic: Војин Божовић; 1 January 1913 – 19 April 1983) was a Yugoslav and Montenegrin football player and manager.

Playing career

Club
He was among the best players in the history of Montenegro and one of the best forwards in the Yugoslav football during the royal period. He was a great dribbler, fantasyst, strong and with an excellent shot with his left foot, beside being an excellent executor of the free kicks.

He started playing in 1931 in the youth squad of Podgorica's Budućnost Podgorica and Belgrade's SK Jugoslavija. He represented SK Obilić, where he formed the front line with the brothers Boža and Kojke Popović, Mačva Šabac, where he played along his brother Vida, SK Jugoslavija and SK Anastas. His best years were spent while playing in BSK Belgrade where, alongside the best country's players Aleksandar Tirnanić, Đorđe Vujadinović, Moša Marjanović, and Svetislav Glišović, won three national titles. After the end of World War II, he played for SR Montenegro in the 1945 championship, and since the reestablishment of the league, he played for FK Budućnost Titograd where he held the managerial job, as well.

International
Beside eleven matches played for Belgrade city selection, and three matches for the Yugoslav B team, he played 8 matches for the Yugoslavia national football team, having scored five goals. His debut was in a friendly match on 6 September 1936 in Belgrade against Poland (9-3 win), where he scored two goals, and his last match was in the last match before World War II, against Hungary in Belgrade (1-1).

Coaching career
He started coaching while still was playing, doing both functions, in Budućnost Titograd. He was the main coach of Yugoslav First League clubs like Radnički Beograd, BSK Beograd, latter called OFK, and FK Sarajevo. For many years he worked abroad, in Libya and Kuwait.

Honours
As player:
BSK Belgrade
3 times Yugoslav First League Champion: 1934–35, 1935–36 and 1938–39

References

External sources

 Profile in Serbian Federation website
 List of Libya coaches in RSSSF

1913 births
1983 deaths
Sportspeople from Cetinje
Association football forwards
Montenegrin footballers
Yugoslav footballers
Yugoslavia international footballers
FK Budućnost Podgorica players
SK Jugoslavija players
FK Obilić players
FK Mačva Šabac players
OFK Beograd players
Yugoslav First League players
Yugoslav football managers
FK Budućnost Podgorica managers
OFK Beograd managers
FK Sutjeska Nikšić managers
FK Sarajevo managers
Libya national football team managers
Qadsia SC managers
Yugoslav expatriate football managers
Expatriate football managers in Libya
Expatriate football managers in Kuwait
Kuwait Premier League managers